Friedrich-Karl "Friedel" Holz (21 January 1919 – 20 May 1941) was a German international footballer.

Personal life
Holz served as a stabsgefreiter (corporal) in the German military during the Second World War and was killed in action in Crete on 20 May 1941. He is commemorated on a plaque at Maleme war cemetery.

References

1919 births
1941 deaths
Association football forwards
German footballers
Germany international footballers
German military personnel killed in World War II